Alterra Mountain Company is an American hospitality company established in 2018 with headquarters in Denver, Colorado. It is privately owned by KSL Capital Partners and Henry Crown and Company, the owners of Aspen/Snowmass. It is a conglomerate of several ski resorts that offers a combined season pass.

History 
In April 2017, KSL and Aspen jointly purchased Intrawest. This acquisition was followed by Mammoth Resorts a few days later and Deer Valley in August. All of these assets were combined with KSL's  Squaw Valley Alpine Meadows ski resort to form Alterra Mountain Company in January 2018.

In late January 2018, Alterra announced the Ikon Pass, a season pass that provides unlimited or restricted access to all of their ski resorts in collaboration with Alta Ski Area, Arapahoe Basin, Aspen/Snowmass, Boyne Resorts, Jackson Hole Mountain Resort, Powdr Corporation, Revelstoke Mountain Resort, SkiBig3, and Snowbird. This is a competitor to Vail Resorts' Epic Pass.

In 2021, Alterra Mountain Company announced its plans to invest $207 million in capital improvements for the upcoming year, including transformational base area and on-mountain developments at Steamboat, Deer Valley Resort, Squaw Valley Alpine Meadows and Mammoth Mountain.

As of 2022, the Chief Executive Officer was Jared Smith.

List of Resorts 

Big Bear Mt. and Snow Summit merged several years before Alterra was formed.  The official title is: Big Bear Mountain Resorts.

References

External links
 

 
Companies based in Denver
2018 establishments in Colorado
Hospitality companies of the United States